Jonathan Heawood is an English journalist and literary editor. He is Executive Director of the Public Interest News Foundation, the first journalism charity in the UK to be awarded charitable status. 

Heawood is the founder and former CEO of IMPRESS, the only press regulator recognised under Royal Charter in the United Kingdom.

He is a former Director of Programmes at the Sigrid Rausing Trust, a private human rights foundation, Director of the English Centre of International PEN, deputy literary editor of The Observer and editor of the Fabian Review. He writes on cultural and political issues for a number of publications, including the Telegraph, Independent, The Guardian, London Review of Books and New Statesman.

He is married to writer Amy Jenkins and they have one child. He is the great grandson of Percy John Heawood, the mathematician.

References

Year of birth missing (living people)
Living people
British male journalists
British literary editors